Petar Lela (born 17 March 1994) is a Croatian footballer who plays as a defender for Regionalliga West side 1. FC Düren.

References

External links
 

1994 births
Living people
Footballers from Split, Croatia
Association football defenders
Croatian footballers
NK Primorac 1929 players
FC Sheriff Tiraspol players
NK Slaven Belupo players
HNK Gorica players
NK Zagora Unešić players
FSV Wacker 90 Nordhausen players
FC Rot-Weiß Erfurt players
SV Babelsberg 03 players
First Football League (Croatia) players
Moldovan Super Liga players
Croatian Football League players
Regionalliga players
Croatian expatriate footballers
Expatriate footballers in Moldova
Croatian expatriate sportspeople in Moldova
Expatriate footballers in Germany
Croatian expatriate sportspeople in Germany